The Jaén Public Library is a public library located in Jaén, Spain.

See also 
 List of libraries in Spain

References

External links 
 Jaén Public Library

Public libraries in Spain
Buildings and structures in Jaén, Spain
Education in Andalusia